Smilovy Hory is a municipality and village in Tábor District in the South Bohemian Region of the Czech Republic. It has about 300 inhabitants.

Administrative parts
Villages of Františkov, Malý Ježov, Obrátice, Radostovice, Stojslavice and Velký Ježov are administrative parts of Smilovy Hory.

Notable people
Adalbertus Ranconis de Ericinio (c. 1320–1388), theologian and philosopher

References

Villages in Tábor District